Leon Alan Lobjoit (born 4 January 1995) is an English footballer who plays for Leighton Town, as a striker.

Career
Born in Hatfield, Lobjoit played youth football with Milton Keynes Dons and Coventry City, and non-league football with Hemel Hempstead Town, New Bradwell St Peter, Leighton Town, Arlesey Town and Buckingham Town. In March 2017 it was announced that he would sign a two-year professional contract with Northampton Town, effective from 1 July 2017. In September 2017 he joined local Evo-Stik Northern Premier League Division One South side Corby Town for a month to gain more first team experience. In October 2017 Lobjoit Joined Nuneaton Town on a one-month loan to gain experience at a higher level. On 2 February 2018 Leon moved to Banbury United on loan. He was released by Northampton at the end of the 2017–18 season, following their relegation. He then played for Brackley Town, AFC Rushden & Diamonds, Oxford City, MK Gallacticos, Bedford Town, Hemel Hempstead Town, Newport Pagnell Town and St Neots Town, before singing for Leighton Town.

References

1995 births
Living people
English footballers
Milton Keynes Dons F.C. players
Coventry City F.C. players
Hemel Hempstead Town F.C. players
New Bradwell St Peter F.C. players
Leighton Town F.C. players
Arlesey Town F.C. players
Queens Park Rangers F.C. players
Buckingham Town F.C. players
Northampton Town F.C. players
Corby Town F.C. players
Nuneaton Borough F.C. players
Banbury United F.C. players
Brackley Town F.C. players
AFC Rushden & Diamonds players
Oxford City F.C. players
Bedford Town F.C. players
Newport Pagnell Town F.C. players
St Neots Town F.C. players

Association football forwards